The Roger Island River is a small tidal estuary between Ipswich and Rowley, Massachusetts. It is a southern branch of the larger Rowley River passing around Roger Island.

Roger Island River is navigable for small craft, and home to bass, shad, alewives. Its banks are lined with tidal salt marshes, and abound in clams. Today the river is popular for kayaking.

References 
  Sammel, Edward A., Water resources of the Parker and Rowley River basins, Massachusetts, USGS Hydrologic Atlas HA-247, 1967.
 USGS Parker River Drainage Basin

Rivers of Essex County, Massachusetts
Rivers of Massachusetts